Naman is a word of Kurdish and Iranian provenance that may refer to:

 Naman, Golestan (نامن - Nāman), village in the Sadan Rostaq-e Sharqi Rural District, in the Central District of Kordkuy County, Golestan Province, Iran
 Naman, Kurdistan (نامن - Namān), village in Howmeh Rural District, in the Central District of Sanandaj County, Kurdistan Province, Iran
 Naman, Razavi Khorasan (نامن - Nāman),  village in Bashtin Rural District, Davarzan District, Sabzevar County, Razavi Khorasan Province, Iran

See also
 Naaman, Aramean military commander